Final Straw is the third studio album and major-label debut by Scottish-Northern Irish rock band Snow Patrol, released on  4 August 2003 in the United Kingdom and Ireland and in 2004 in the United States. The album is notable for bringing the band their first mainstream success outside of their native countries of Northern Ireland and Scotland. In the 14 months following its release, a total of 5 singles were drawn from it. It is the first album to feature lead guitarist Nathan Connolly and the last to feature bassist Mark McClelland.

The album was re-released in the UK in 2004 with two extra tracks, before being exported to the US (without the bonus tracks). The album was also released on SACD and DualDisc with 5.1 Surround mixes.

Background
The band's A&R representative Jim Chancellor explained the reasons for choosing rock producer Jacknife Lee to oversee the record by saying, "I wanted a record for them that was bigger and bolder and a lot different than their previous records. I wanted them to make a more of a rock album than an indie record." Chancellor, Lee and the band chose fifteen songs to start working on out of an original pool of 24. Critical to the new direction was Lightbody's development into a more rounded songwriter. "They played us some songs which were not indie. There were a couple of pop songs and then 'Run', which is an enormous emotional rollercoaster of a track," said Chancellor.

Recording and composition
During the first couple of weeks in the studio the band found it quite difficult to adapt from an 'indie'-oriented sound to a more commercially viable pop rock sound. Producer Lee offered constructive suggestions about how to both simplify their songs and augment them with other sounds such as strings, and Snow Patrol proved very receptive to his advice. According to Chancellor, "Some bands tend to be more defensive about what goes on in the studio. Snow Patrol weren't. They were very much like, 'Yeah, we really want to be successful this time.'"

The lyrics, all written by Lightbody are about failing relationships and break-ups. They were inspired by his personal experiences. Quinn, his longtime friend, says that he knows who Lightbody sings about in those songs. The lyrics deal with the themes of relationships and politics. Lightbody has said that his "finally learn[ing] to write a chorus" was the key to the album's success.

Guitarist Nathan Connolly joined the band during the recording sessions. He did not contribute much, as the whole album had already been demoed. He commented that he found it easy to start writing and sharing his ideas with the rest of the band, as he had a good relationship with the band before being a member. The album's music incorporates distorted guitar, feedback styles, and the vocals are gritty. The band's sound on the album was described as being a "cross between the sullen folk of Nick Drake and the more punchy rock moments of Simple Minds and the Pixies. Reviewing the album, Pitchfork described the performances as being based around "rigid, unwavering tempos that approximate dance music," created through looped sections of playing augmented with electronics. The first song, "How to Be Dead", introduces this sound with extensive use of drum machine programming.

Release and reception

Final Straw received generally positive reviews from critics. According to Metacritic, the album received a weighted mean review score of 73 out of 100 based on 21 reviews, indicating "generally favorable reviews". Before repromotion of the album, sales reached 20,000 copies.

Track listing

The AOL sessions feature frontman Gary Lightbody & lead guitarist Nathan Connolly being interviewed, and performing an acoustic rendition of "Run".
The dualdisc version does not include the UK bonus tracks.

Personnel
Gary Lightbody – vocals, guitar, glockenspiel, backing vocals, keyboards
Mark McClelland – bass guitar, keyboards
Jonny Quinn – drums
Nathan Connolly – guitar, backing vocals
Other personnel

Stephen Marcussen – mastering
Louie Teran – mastering
Iain Archer – background vocals (on track 12)
Bruce White – viola
James Banbury – piano, strings, cello
Fiona McCapra – violin
Ben Georgiades – engineer

Dan Swift – engineer
Jacknife Lee – producer, mixing
Phil Tyreman – assistant engineer
Ian Dowling – assistant engineer
Mike Nelson – mixing
Jeff McLaughlin – assistant
Chris Lord-Alge – mixing

Charts

Certifications

References

2003 albums
Snow Patrol albums
Albums produced by Jacknife Lee
Fiction Records albums
A&M Records albums